Tomah Area School District is the school district serving Tomah, Wisconsin and surrounding areas.

Schools

Elementary schools 
 Camp Douglas Elementary (grades 3–5)
 LaGrange Elementary (grades 4K-5)
 Lemonweir Elementary (grades 4K-5)
 Miller Elementary (grades K-5)
 Oakdale Elementary (grades 4K-2)
 Tomah Area Montessori School (grades 4K-3)
 Warrens Elementary (grades 4K-5)
 Wyeville Elementary (grades K-5)

Middle school
Tomah Middle School (grades 6–8)

High school 
 Tomah High School (grades 9–12)

Tomah High School is located on 901 Lincoln Avenue in Tomah, Wisconsin.

Tomah High School offers honors and advanced placement classes. It has a pre-engineering program called "Project Lead the Way". The ACE Academy allows students to participate in architecture, construction, and engineering. The Jobs for America's Graduates Program (JAG) allows students to gain useful employment experience. A medical pathway CNA course is also offered.

German, Spanish, and Ho-Chunk languages are taught.

THS offers art classes, including AP art, graphic art, and media productions.

Extracurricular activities
Tomah Area School District is a part of the Mississippi Valley Conference (MVC).  The school's athletic teams are known as the Timberwolves. Sports offered include:

Athletics:
 Baseball
 Basketball
 Bowling
 Cheerleading
 Cross country
 Dance
 Football
 Golf
 Gymnastics
 Hockey
 Horsemanship
 Powerlifting
 Rodeo
 Soccer
 Softball
 Special Olympics
 Tennis
 Track and field
 Volleyball
 Wrestling

Extracurricular activities include:
 DECA
 FFA
 HOSA
 Performing arts (drama, instrumental music, vocal music)
 Academic competitions
 Service organizations
 Student government
 Leadership groups

Tomah High School's band performed in the 2015 Outback Bowl in Tampa, Florida.  More than 100 students participate in band.

The THS show choir, named "Limited Edition" competes throughout the Midwest.

References

External links
 

School districts in Wisconsin
Education in Monroe County, Wisconsin